Douglas Gibson Hamilton (born 15 August 1941) is an Australian chess player who holds the titles of FIDE Master and International Correspondence Chess Master (2001). He is a three-time Australian Chess Championship winner (1965, 1967, 1982).

Biography
In the 1960s and 1970s, Hamilton was one of the strongest chess players in Australia. He regularly participated in the Australian Chess Championship and won this tournament three times: in 1965, 1967, and 1982. In 1966, in Auckland, Hamilton played in the World Chess Championship South East Asian Zonal tournament and shared 5th–6th place.

Hamilton played for Australia in the Chess Olympiads:
 in 1968, at the first board in the 18th Chess Olympiad in Lugano (+5, =5, -5),
 in 1970, at the third board in the 19th Chess Olympiad in Siegen (+8, =5, -4),
 in 1972, at the first reserve in the 20th Chess Olympiad in Skopje (+8, =3, -4).

In later years, Hamilton actively participated in correspondence chess tournaments. In 2001, he was awarded the ICCF International Correspondence Chess Master (ICCM) title.

References

External links
 
 
 
 
 

1941 births
Living people
Australian chess players
Chess FIDE Masters
Chess Olympiad competitors
Sportspeople from Melbourne